Eveleth is a city in St. Louis County, Minnesota, United States. The population was 3,718 at the 2010 census.

U.S. Highway 53 and State Highway 37 (MN 37) are two of the main routes in Eveleth.

Eveleth was the site of the conflict that resulted in the court case Jenson v. Eveleth Taconite Co., and the film based on it, North Country. The United States Hockey Hall of Fame is in Eveleth.

Eveleth is part of the Quad Cities, with Virginia, Gilbert, and Mountain Iron.

History
The community was named after Erwin Eveleth, a prominent employee of a timber company in the area. In 1895, iron ore was discovered beneath the village site and a post office was established. In 1900, the village moved to its present location. It was incorporated as a city in 1902. When the city expanded, it annexed portions of Fayal Township, including the former unincorporated communities of Alice Mine Station (in the Alice Location south of downtown) and Fayal. With further expansion, Eveleth annexed the unincorporated community of Genoa to its east. Eveleth first established its post office on February 9, 1895, with P. Ellard Dowling as commander-in-chief. Eveleth also had its first paper, The Eveleth Star, the same year.

Geography

Eveleth is in the Duluth MN-WI Metropolitan Statistical Area.

Climate
The Köppen Climate Classification subtype for this climate is "Dfb". (Warm Summer Continental Climate). Summers are warm and winters are cold.

Demographics

2010 census
As of the census of 2010, there were 3,718 people, 1,682 households, and 921 families living in the city. The racial makeup of the city was 95.0% White, 0.5% African American, 1.8% Native American, 0.3% Asian, 0.1% from other races, and 2.2% from two or more races. Hispanic or Latino of any race were 0.9% of the population.

There were 1,682 households, of which 28.5% had children under the age of 18 living with them, 36.0% were married couples living together, 13.1% had a female householder with no husband present, 5.6% had a male householder with no wife present, and 45.2% were non-families. 38.9% of all households were made up of individuals, and 13.2% had someone living alone who was 65 years of age or older. The average household size was 2.14 and the average family size was 2.83.

The median age in the city was 39.6 years. 22.8% of residents were under the age of 18; 8.2% were between the ages of 18 and 24; 25.5% were from 25 to 44; 27.3% were from 45 to 64; and 16.1% were 65 years of age or older. The gender makeup of the city was 48.7% male and 51.3% female.

2000 census
As of the 2000 census, there were 3,865 people, 1,717 households, and 971 families living in the city. The racial makeup of the city was 96.48% White, 0.16% African American, 1.73% Native American, 0.41% Asian, 0.08% from other races, and 1.14% from two or more races. Hispanic or Latino of any race were 0.23% of the population. 16.6% were of Finnish, 14.1% German, 14.1% Norwegian, 8.6% Italian, 7.7% Slovene and 6.1% Swedish ancestry.

There were 1,717 households, out of which 26.8% had children under the age of 18 living with them, 40.4% were married couples living together, 11.8% had a female householder with no husband present, and 43.4% were non-families. 38.1% of all households were made up of individuals, and 16.2% had someone living alone who was 65 years of age or older.  The average household size was 2.14 and the average family size was 2.80.

In the city, the population was spread out, with 21.6% under the age of 18, 8.6% from 18 to 24, 26.5% from 25 to 44, 22.2% from 45 to 64, and 21.1% who were 65 years of age or older.  The median age was 41 years. For every 100 females, there were 89.2 males.  For every 100 females age 18 and over, there were 84.0 males.

The median income for a household in the city was $27,736, and the median income for a family was $37,069. Males had a median income of $32,723 versus $21,658 for females. The per capita income for the city was $16,635.  About 10.6% of families and 15.4% of the population were below the poverty line, including 20.3% of those under age 18 and 14.2% of those age 65 or over.

Economy
Eveleth is on the Mesabi Range, one of sub-regions of Minnesota's Iron Range. The town's economy has always been tied to the iron ore mining and processing. This activity peaked during World War II and declined through the second half of the 20th century. A demand for iron ore occurred between 2005 and 2007, and local economies experienced a mild improvement due to improved mining productivity, which allowed demand to be met with only a modest increase in staffing.

Within Eveleth's city limits is Thunderbird Mine, where crude iron ore is processed into 5.5 million tons of iron ore taconite pellets per year. The ore is magnetite-bearing iron formation of the Paleoproterozoic Biwabik Iron Formation, and is crushed at the mine site and shipped by railroad to the Fairlane Plant in Forbes, Minnesota, for concentrating and pelletizing.

Arts and culture

Landmarks
Eveleth once had side-by-side water towers labeled "hot" and "cold".

In popular culture
The feature films Wildrose (1984) and North Country (2005) were both shot in Eveleth.

Hockey

The United States Hockey Hall of Fame (not to be confused with the Hockey Hall of Fame, in Toronto) is in Eveleth. The city has long been noted as a powerhouse of hockey talent. It has won several state championships, most recently in 1998. During the 1950s the Eveleth Golden Bears dominated high school hockey in Minnesota, garnering a number of state records, including most consecutive state championships (4: 1948–51), most consecutive championship games (5: 1948–52) and most consecutive tournament appearances (12: 1945–56), despite the district's tiny population.

Eveleth has the "world's largest authentic hockey stick", standing at 107 feet and weighing 3 tons. A few blocks away from the stick is the Eveleth Hippodrome, Minnesota's oldest hockey arena still in use. The Rock Ridge Wolverines Boys & Girls hockey teams play there as one out of two of their home rinks, the other being the Iron Trail Motors Event Center in Virginia.

The Eveleth Reds played in the United States Amateur Hockey Association between 1920 and 1925, and in the inaugural season of 1920–21 finished as runner-ups to the Cleveland Indians after losing a closely contested four-game series 12 goals to 14 in April 1921. Eveleth's biggest star player was defenseman Ivan "Ching" Johnson, who played three seasons for the club between 1920 and 1923, and was inducted into the Hockey Hall of Fame in 1958.

Notable people

George Abramson, NFL player
Fred Agnich, member of the Texas House of Representatives 
Rudy Ahlin, played one game in the NHL
Nick Begich, U.S. representative
Myron H. Bright, United States Court judge
Frank Brimsek, NHL goalie
John Patrick Boyle, Minnesota state senator and lawyer
Steve Cannon, WCCO radio personality
Arthur Cirilli, member of Wisconsin Senate
Roy R. Coombe, Minnesota state legislator
Andre Gambucci, hockey player who won a silver medal at the 1952 Winter Olympics
 Willard Ikola, hockey player who won a silver medal at the 1956 Winter Olympics
Elmer A. Lampe, college football player and coach
Pete LoPresti, NHL goalie, son of Sam LoPresti
Sam LoPresti, NHL goalie
John Mariucci, NHL hockey player and coach
John Mayasich, hockey player, 1960 Winter Olympic gold medalist
 John Matchefts, hockey player who won a silver medal at the 1956 Winter Olympics
William R. Ojala, Minnesota state representative
Doug Palazzari, professional hockey player
Joe Papike, played 20 games in the NHL
Mark Pavelich, winner of the 1980 USA hockey gold medal
Matt Perushek, lawyer and Junior Olympics gold and bronze medal-winning curler
Paul Schaefer, played five games in the NHL
Kay Nolte Smith, writer
Tony Storti, head coach of the Montana State Bobcats football team
Al Suomi, professional hockey player
Verner E. Suomi, educator, inventor, scientist, and "father of satellite meteorology"
Tom Yurkovich, hockey player who competed at the 1964 Winter Olympics

References

External links
 City of Eveleth, MN – Official Website
 Eveleth Heritage Committee's historical website

Cities in Minnesota
Cities in St. Louis County, Minnesota
Mining communities in Minnesota
1913 establishments in Minnesota